The Rising Sea is the fifteenth book in the NUMA Files series, created by American author Clive Cussler. It was published on March 13, 2018.

Summary
The story revolves around Kurt Austin and Joe Zavala, a pair of troubleshooting good guys. It's an adventure-thriller story that covers Japan and Shanghai.
A sudden alarming rise in the world's sea levels sends NUMA team along with the protagonist Kurt Austin around the globe in search of answers.

Reception

References

2018 American novels
The NUMA Files
American thriller novels
G. P. Putnam's Sons books
Collaborative novels